Route 104 is a Connecticut state highway in the city of Stamford, starting at from the Bulls Head section of the city then through North Stamford, with the highway ending at New York state line.

Route description
Route 104 begins at an intersection with Route 137 in the Bulls Head section of Stamford and heads north, passing by GE Capital, then crossing the Rippowam River, up through North Stamford and onto New York state line. After another , Route 104 crosses over the Mianus River, through the Long Ridge section of the city, as it heads towards the New York state line. The road ends in the town of Pound Ridge, New York and continues as Westchester County Road 3. Route 104 is known as Long Ridge Road throughout its length and is classified as a principal arterial road, carrying traffic volumes of as much as 30,000 vehicles per day, particularly near the Merritt Parkway interchange. Route 104 is four lanes wide from Route 137 to Route 15, and two lanes wide north of Route 15.

History
In the 1920s, the route from downtown Stamford to the Long Ridge section of the city was a secondary state highway known as Highway 300. It ran from U.S. Route 1 along Bedford Street and Long Ridge Road up to the New York state line. Highway 300 was renumbered as Route 104 in the 1932 state highway renumbering. In 1976, Route 137 was extended south along Washington Boulevard (parallel to Bedford Street) to US 1 and Route 104 was truncated to its current south end at Route 137.

Major intersections

References

104
Transportation in Fairfield County, Connecticut
Transportation in Stamford, Connecticut